The Kansas City Royals farm system consists of seven Minor League Baseball affiliates across the United States and in the Dominican Republic. Four teams are independently owned, while two—the Arizona Complex League Royals and two Dominican Summer League Royals teams—are owned by the major league club.

The Royals have been affiliated with the Triple-A Omaha Storm Chasers of the Pacific Coast League since 1969, making it the longest-running active affiliation in the organization among teams not owned by the Royals. It is also the longest affiliation in team history. Their newest affiliates are the Quad Cities River Bandits of the Midwest League and the Columbia Fireflies of the Florida State League, which became affiliates in 2021.

Key

2021–present
The current structure of Minor League Baseball is the result of an overall contraction of the system beginning with the 2021 season. Class A was reduced to two levels: High-A and Low-A. Low-A was reclassified as Single-A in 2022.

1990–2020
Minor League Baseball operated with six classes from 1990 to 2020. The Class A level was subdivided for a second time with the creation of Class A-Advanced. The Rookie level consisted of domestic and foreign circuits.

1968–1989
The foundation of the minors' current structure was the result of a reorganization initiated by Major League Baseball (MLB) before the 1963 season. The reduction from six classes to four (Triple-A, Double-AA, Class A, and Rookie) was a response to the general decline of the minors throughout the 1950s and early-1960s when leagues and teams folded due to shrinking attendance caused by baseball fans' preference for staying at home to watch MLB games on television. The only change made within the next 27 years was Class A being subdivided for the first time to form Class A Short Season in 1966.

References

External links
 Major League Baseball Prospect News: Kansas City Royals
 Baseball-Reference: Kansas City Royals League Affiliations

Minor league affiliates
Kansas City Royals minor league affiliates